In number theory, a branch of mathematics, Ramanujan's ternary quadratic form is the algebraic expression  with integral values for x, y and z.  Srinivasa Ramanujan considered this expression in a footnote in a paper  published in 1916  and briefly discussed the representability of integers in this form. After giving necessary and sufficient conditions that an integer cannot be represented in the form  for certain specific values of a, b and c, Ramanujan observed in a footnote: "(These) results may tempt us to suppose that there are similar simple results for the form  whatever are the values of a, b and c. It appears, however, that in most cases there are no such simple results." To substantiate this observation, Ramanujan discussed the form which is now referred to as Ramanujan's ternary quadratic form.

Properties discovered by Ramanujan
In his 1916 paper Ramanujan made the following observations about the form .
The even numbers that are not of the form  are 4λ(16μ + 6).
The odd numbers that are not of the form , viz.  do not seem to obey any simple law.

Odd numbers beyond 391
By putting an ellipsis at the end of the list of odd numbers not representable as x2 + y2 + 10z2, Ramanujan indicated that his list was incomplete. It was not clear whether Ramanujan intended it to be a finite list or infinite list. This prompted others to look for such odd numbers. In 1927, Burton W. Jones and Gordon Pall discovered that the number 679 could not be expressed in the form  and they also verified that there were no  other such numbers below 2000. He also verified that there were no other  such numbers below 20000. Further progress in this direction took place only after the development of modern computers. Galway verified that there are only eighteen numbers less than 2 × 1010 not representable in the form . Based on Galway's computations, Ken Ono and K. Soundararajan formulated the following conjecture:

The odd positive integers which are not of the form x2 +  are: .

Some known results
The conjecture of Ken Ono and Soundararajan has not been fully resolved. However, besides the results enunciated by Ramanujan, a few more general results about the form have been established. The proofs of some of them are quite simple while those of the others involve quite complicated concepts and arguments.

Every integer of the form 10n + 5 is represented by Ramanujan's ternary quadratic form.
If n is an odd integer which is not square-free then it can be represented in the form .
There are only a finite number of odd integers which cannot be represented in the form x2 + y2 + 10z2.
If  the generalized Riemann hypothesis is true, then the conjecture of Ono and Soundararajan is also true.
Ramanujan's ternary quadratic form is not regular in the sense of L.E. Dickson.

References

Srinivasa Ramanujan
Quadratic forms
Squares in number theory